Dachne is a village in Koriukivka Raion, Chernihiv Oblast (province) of Ukraine.

Geography

References

Villages in Koriukivka Raion